Trenton Thompson (born December 18, 1997) is an American football defensive back for the New York Giants of the National Football League (NFL).

Early life and education
Thompson was born on December 18, 1997, in Palm Springs, California. He attended Palm Springs High School and played three seasons of football there, earning two varsity letters. He helped them compile an overall record of 24–3 in his final two years, leading them to the CIF championship as a senior. At the time of his graduation, Thompson had recorded 219 total tackles, four interceptions, six fumbles forced as well as six blocked kicks. He was graded an 87/100 by 247Sports and was named a three-star recruit by several organizations, being ranked the 15th-best outside linebacker nationally by Scout.com.

Thompson received seven Division I scholarship offers and chose to attend San Diego State University. After missing the first six games of his true freshman season (2016), Thompson played as a backup to Malik Smith in the final eight, recording nine total tackles. The following season, he appeared in three games, making one tackle, before suffering a season-ending injury and redshirting.

As a sophomore in 2018, Thompson appeared in all 13 games, starting in eight, and totaled 57 tackles. He also made one interception, one forced fumble, and returned a blocked punt for a touchdown. He played in 12 games as a junior in 2019 and tallied 44 tackles and a blocked punt. In a COVID-19-shortened 2020 season, Thompson made 36 tackles and a blocked kick.

After being given an extra year of eligibility due to COVID-19, Thompson opted to return to San Diego State in 2021 and was elected a team captain. In his sixth year with the program, Thompson started 14 games and recorded 44 tackles, three interceptions, and a forced fumble. He also broke up 15 passes, good enough for second in the conference, on his way to being named first-team All-Mountain West. He was also selected second-team All-American by College Football Focus and third-team by Pro Football Network. Thompson finished his college career having played in 57 games, tied for the most in school history with Taylor Hawkins.

Professional career
After going unselected in the 2022 NFL Draft, Thompson was signed by the New York Giants as an undrafted free agent, being given a three-year contract worth $2.572 million. Considered a long shot to make the final roster, he was released on August 30, but later re-signed to the practice squad. He was signed to the active roster on November 23, and made his NFL debut in the Giants' week twelve game against the Dallas Cowboys, appearing on twelve special teams snaps in the loss. Thompson was released afterwards and brought back to the practice squad. He signed a reserve/future contract on January 22, 2023.

References

1997 births
Living people
American football outside linebackers
American football defensive backs
Sportspeople from Palm Springs, California
San Diego State Aztecs football players
New York Giants players